Jan Schubert (7 March 1910 – 20 December 1960) was a Dutch footballer. He played in two matches for the Netherlands national football team in 1939.

References

External links
 

1910 births
1960 deaths
Dutch footballers
Netherlands international footballers
Place of birth missing
Association footballers not categorized by position